Count Engelbert II of Berg, also known as Saint Engelbert, Engelbert of Cologne, Engelbert I, Archbishop of Cologne or Engelbert I of Berg, Archbishop of Cologne (1185 or 1186, Schloss Burg – 7 November 1225, Gevelsberg) was archbishop of Cologne and a saint; he was notoriously murdered by a member of his own family.

Early life
Engelbert was born in 1185 or 1186 in Schloss Burg (present ), the younger son of Count Engelbert I of Berg and his wife Margarete of Guelders. He was educated at the cathedral school in Cologne. From 1198 (at the age of twelve or thirteen) he held the office of provost of St. George in Cologne, and from 1199 to 1216 he also held the office of cathedral provost at Cologne Cathedral. He further acquired at various times a number of other provostships: in Cologne, Aachen, Deventer and Zutphen. He was elected Bishop of Münster in 1203, but he declined because of his age.

Engelbert was excommunicated by Pope Innocent III in 1206, on account of his support for his cousin Adolf of Altena, archbishop of Cologne, in the interests of Philip of Swabia against Otto of Brunswick but was pardoned in 1208. In 1212, as an act of penance for his earlier rebellion, he took part in the Albigensian Crusade. He gave his allegiance to the future Frederick II, Holy Roman Emperor, after the Battle of Bouvines in 1214.

Archbishop of Cologne and after

Engelbert was elected Archbishop of Cologne as Engelbert I on 29 February 1216 and was consecrated on 24 September 1217, in which office he remained until his violent death.

Engelbert came to enjoy the trust of Frederick II, Holy Roman Emperor, becoming imperial regent (Reichsverweser) in 1220 and guardian of the Emperor's son Henry. In 1222, Engelbert crowned twelve-years-old Henry as King of the Romans in Aachen. Engelbert remained Henry's tutor and guardian until his death.

Clearly, however, in the increased powers it gave to all ecclesiastical princes it was of benefit also to the archbishops of Cologne, and the establishment and development of the new powers was part of Engelbert's archiepiscopal strategy.

When Engelbert succeeded, the rights and territories of the archdiocese were in bad order, following a long period of civil unrest in Germany. He engaged himself at once in a series of campaigns and strategies to win them back and safeguard them, principally against the Dukes of Limburg and their allies the County of Cleves. Engelbert in turn set up alliances with Brabant and Namur.

Engelbert also defended his personal inheritance as Count of Berg against Duke Waleran III of Limburg. In 1218 Engelbert's elder brother Count Adolf VI of Berg died on the Fifth Crusade without a male heir. Waleran considered himself entitled to inherit the County of Berg because his son Henry was married to Irmgard of Berg, Adolf's only daughter. According to the Salic law, however, Engelbert was the heir. He won the dispute in two feuds. In 1220 a peace was concluded and Waleran's claim settled by the payment of a year's revenues.

Engelbert granted town privileges to many places, including Wipperfürth, Attendorn, Brilon, Siegen, Werl and Herford, Vianden, Hamm, Neuerburg and Manderscheid.

During his incumbency as archbishop, Engelbert continued to fight for the re-establishment and security of the Archdiocese of Cologne both as an ecclesiastical authority and also as a secular territory. (It was said of him that despite his personal piety he was more of a monarch than a churchman). Not only did he constantly battle, by all means necessary, for the secular well-being of the lands of the archdiocese, of which he may be counted the de facto founder as a significant state; he also took energetic measures for the effective regulation of the City of Cologne itself; and he was a zealous champion of the religious throughout his archdiocese.

Death

Engelbert earned the respect and affection of his subjects through his devotion to justice and his energy in maintaining law, and took great pains to ensure the well-being of the religious within his authority. However, his effectiveness in achieving his goals by all means necessary, including military action, his allegiance to the pope and the emperor, and his uncompromising defence of the law and the rights of religious persons and bodies, brought him into conflict with the nobility, including his own family, and this led to his death.

His cousin Count Frederick of Isenberg was vogt of Essen Abbey, and abused his position by defrauding the nuns. Engelbert was determined to protect the nuns' interests and sought to bring Frederick to justice. On 7 November 1225 while they travelled together to Cologne from a judicial hearing in Soest, Engelbert was killed, possibly by Frederick, in a defile near present-day Gevelsberg near Schwelm.

It seems probable that a group of disaffected nobility was behind the attack which may have been intended to take Engelbert captive rather than kill him.

Engelbert's body was taken to Cologne on a dung-cart, and when examined, found to have forty-seven wounds.

Veneration
Engelbert's body was buried in Cologne Cathedral on 24 February 1226 by order of Cardinal Conrad of Urach, the papal legate, who declared him a martyr, though a formal canonization did not take place.  His remains are preserved today in a Baroque shrine prepared on the authority of Ferdinand of Bavaria, archbishop of Cologne, who in 1618 also ordered the celebration of his feast on 7 November.

See also

Notes

References

This article is in part based on a translation of the article in the German Wikipedia

Further reading

  An article on the murder of Engelbert 1225
 Kreuzzug gegen die Albigenser. Engelbert I of Berg, Archbishop of Cologne Page: 183, 198, 299, 300, 373. Autor; Pierre des Vaux de Cernay. Wissenschaftliche Buchgesellschaft Darmstadt nr. 13688-8. 1996

External links

 Biography on genealogie-mittelalter.de
 07. November 1225 from the Exhibition NRW 2000
http://www.santiebeati.it/dettaglio/76425
 
 
 
 The death of Archbishop Engelbert of Cologne, poem by Annette von Droste-Hülshoff at Project Gutenberg
 Engelbert's shrine in Cologne Cathedral

 

1180s births
1225 deaths
Year of birth uncertain
Medieval murder victims
People from Solingen
Archbishops of Cologne
Engelbert 01
13th-century Roman Catholic archbishops in the Holy Roman Empire
Counts of Berg
German Roman Catholic saints

House of Limburg-Stirum
Burials at Cologne Cathedral
13th-century Christian saints
Recipients of papal pardons